2009 World Championships may refer to:
 Alpine skiing: Alpine World Ski Championships 2009
 Aquatics: 2009 World Aquatics Championships
 Athletics: 2009 World Championships in Athletics
Cross-country running: 2009 IAAF World Cross Country Championships
Half marathon: 2009 IAAF World Half Marathon Championships
 Badminton: 2009 BWF World Championships
 Boxing: 2009 World Amateur Boxing Championships
 Curling:
 2009 Ford World Men's Curling Championship
 2009 World Women's Curling Championship
 Darts:
 2009 BDO World Darts Championship
 2009 PDC World Darts Championship
 Fencing: 2009 World Fencing Championships
 Figure skating: 2009 World Figure Skating Championships
 Gymnastics
 Artistic Gymnastics 2009 World Artistic Gymnastics Championships
 Rhythmic Gymnastics 2009 World Rhythmic Gymnastics Championships
 Freestyle skiing: FIS Freestyle World Ski Championships 2009
 Handball:
 2009 World Men's Handball Championship
 2009 World Women's Handball Championship
 Ice hockey:
 2009 Men's World Ice Hockey Championships
 2009 Women's World Ice Hockey Championships
 Nordic skiing: FIS Nordic World Ski Championships 2009
 Speed skating
Allround: 2009 World Allround Speed Skating Championships
Sprint: 2009 World Sprint Speed Skating Championships
Single distances: 2009 World Single Distance Speed Skating Championships
 Six-red snooker: 2009 Six-red World Championship
 Snooker: 2009 World Snooker Championship
 Table tennis: 2009 World Table Tennis Championships

See also
 2009 World Cup (disambiguation)
 2009 Continental Championships (disambiguation)
 2009 World Junior Championships (disambiguation)